The Ivorian Civil War may refer one of two civil wars in Ivory Coast:
The First Ivorian Civil War (2002–2007)
The Second Ivorian Civil War (2010–2011)